The 2001–02 NBA season was the 76ers 53rd season in the National Basketball Association, and 39th season in Philadelphia. The 76ers were coming off of an NBA Finals defeat to the Los Angeles Lakers, in which they won Game 1, but lost the next 4 games. During the off-season, the team re-acquired forward Sixers forward Derrick Coleman from the Charlotte Hornets in a three-team trade, acquired Matt Harpring from the Cleveland Cavaliers, acquired Vonteego Cummings from the Golden State Warriors, and signed free agent Derrick McKey midway through the season.

Having won the Eastern Conference Championship last season, reigning MVP Allen Iverson, Sixth Man Aaron McKie, and point guard Eric Snow were all sidelined with injuries as the Sixers lost their first five games; Iverson was out with an elbow injury, McKie had a shoulder injury, and Snow was out with a broken thumb. Also just four games into the season, center Matt Geiger retired. However, when their players returned, they won seven in a row after their bad start, but then lost seven straight in December leading to a 8–14 start. The Sixers would play above .500 for the remainder of the season, holding a 25–24 record at the All-Star break, and would climb back into playoff connection finishing fourth in the Atlantic Division with a 43–39 record.

Iverson averaged 31.4 points, 5.5 assists and 2.8 steals per game in 60 games this season, and was named to the All-NBA Second Team, while Dikembe Mutombo averaged 11.5 points, 10.8 rebounds and 2.4 blocks per game and was named to the All-NBA Third Team, and to the NBA All-Defensive Second Team. In addition, Coleman averaged 15.1 points and 8.8 rebounds per game, while McKie provided the team with 12.2 points per game, Harpring contributed 11.8 points and 7.1 rebounds per game, and Snow provided with 12.1 points, 6.6 assists and 1.6 steals per game. Iverson and Mutombo were both selected for the 2002 NBA All-Star Game, which Philadelphia hosted and Iverson wore number #6 to honor Hall of Famer, and 76ers legend Julius Erving. Iverson also finished in ninth place in Most Valuable Player voting, and Mutombo finished tied in third place in Defensive Player of the Year voting.

However, the Sixers lost in the Eastern Conference First Round of the playoffs to the Boston Celtics in five games. Following the season, Mutombo was traded to the New Jersey Nets, while Harpring signed as a free agent with the Utah Jazz, rookie guard Speedy Claxton was traded to the San Antonio Spurs, Cummings was released to free agency, and McKey retired.

Offseason
During the offseason, the 76ers made multiple trades. On August 3, the organization traded Tyrone Hill to the Cleveland Cavaliers (where he had previously played four seasons) for Matt Harpring, Cedric Henderson, and Robert Traylor. On the same day, the 76ers would trade Roshown McLeod and a 2003 1st round draft pick to the Boston Celtics for Jérôme Moïso. Harpring would be Philadelphia's starting small forward for the season, while Henderson, Traylor, and Moïso would be traded before the season started.

On October 2, the 76ers signed Ira Bowman. Bowman would play 3 games before being waived on November 6.

On October 25, the 76ers were involved in a three-team trade with the Golden State Warriors and the Charlotte Hornets. The 76ers traded Cedric Henderson and a 2005 1st round draft pick to the Warriors. They also traded George Lynch, Jérôme Moïso, and Robert Traylor to the Hornets. The 76ers received Derrick Coleman from the Hornets and Corie Blount and Vonteego Cummings from the Warriors.

Draft picks

Roster

Regular season

Season standings

z - clinched division title
y - clinched division title
x - clinched playoff spot

Record vs. opponents

Game log

Playoffs

|- align="center" bgcolor="#ffcccc"
| 1
| April 21
| @ Boston
| L 82–92
| Allen Iverson (20)
| Dikembe Mutombo (11)
| Eric Snow (5)
| FleetCenter18,624
| 0–1
|- align="center" bgcolor="#ffcccc"
| 2
| April 25
| @ Boston
| L 85–93
| Allen Iverson (29)
| Derrick Coleman (13)
| Allen Iverson (7)
| FleetCenter18,624
| 0–2
|- align="center" bgcolor="#ccffcc"
| 3
| April 28
| Boston
| W 108–103
| Allen Iverson (42)
| Dikembe Mutombo (11)
| Eric Snow (5)
| First Union Center20,689
| 1–2
|- align="center" bgcolor="#ccffcc"
| 4
| May 1
| Boston
| W 83–81
| Allen Iverson (28)
| Dikembe Mutombo (14)
| Eric Snow (11)
| First Union Center20,904
| 2–2
|- align="center" bgcolor="#ffcccc"
| 5
| May 3
| @ Boston
| L 87–120
| Allen Iverson (31)
| Matt Harpring (8)
| Iverson, McKie (4)
| FleetCenter18,624
| 2–3
|-

Player statistics

NOTE: Please write the players statistics in alphabetical order by last name.

Season

Playoffs

Awards and records
 Allen Iverson, All-NBA Second Team
 Dikembe Mutombo, All-NBA Third Team
 Dikembe Mutombo, NBA All-Defensive Second Team

References

See also
 2001-02 NBA season

Philadelphia 76ers seasons
Philadelphia
Philadelphia
Philadelphia